Mir Abdoli-ye Zarrin Choqa (also Romanized as Mīr ‘Abdolī-ye Zarrīn Choqā; also known as Mīr ‘Abdolī) is a village in Shiveh Sar Rural District, Bayangan District, Paveh County, Kermanshah Province, Iran. At the 2006 census, its population was 408, in 92 families.

References 

Populated places in Paveh County